The Birmingham A's were a Minor League Baseball team that played in the Double-A Southern League from 1967 to 1975. They were located in Birmingham, Alabama, and were named for their Major League Baseball affiliates, the Kansas City Athletics (1967) and Oakland Athletics (1968–1975). They played their home games at Rickwood Field.

Players
Birmingham A's players (1967–1975)

References

1967 establishments in Alabama
1975 disestablishments in Alabama
Baseball teams established in 1967
Baseball teams disestablished in 1975
Defunct Southern League (1964–present) teams
Kansas City Athletics minor league affiliates
Oakland Athletics minor league affiliates
Professional baseball teams in Alabama
Sports teams in Birmingham, Alabama
Defunct baseball teams in Alabama